In physics, the S-matrix or scattering matrix relates the initial state and the final state of a physical system undergoing a scattering process. It is used in quantum mechanics, scattering theory and quantum field theory (QFT).

More formally, in the context of QFT, the S-matrix is defined as the unitary matrix connecting sets of asymptotically free particle states (the in-states and the out-states) in the Hilbert space of physical states. Asymptotically free then means that the state has this appearance in either the distant past or the distant future.

While the S-matrix may be defined for any background (spacetime) that is asymptotically solvable and has no event horizons, it has a simple form in the case of the Minkowski space. It is defined only in the limit of zero energy density (or infinite particle separation distance).

It can be shown that if a quantum field theory in Minkowski space has a mass gap, the state in the asymptotic past and in the asymptotic future are both described by Fock spaces.

History
The S-matrix was first introduced by John Archibald Wheeler in the 1937 paper "On the Mathematical Description of Light Nuclei by the Method of Resonating Group Structure". In this paper Wheeler introduced a scattering matrix – a unitary matrix of coefficients connecting "the asymptotic behaviour of an arbitrary particular solution [of the integral equations] with that of solutions of a standard form", but did not develop it fully.

In the 1940s, Werner Heisenberg independently developed and substantiated the idea of the S-matrix. Because of the problematic divergences present in quantum field theory at that time, Heisenberg was motivated to isolate the essential features of the theory that would not be affected by future changes as the theory developed. In doing so, he was led to introduce a unitary "characteristic" S-matrix.

Today, however, exact S-matrix results are a crowning achievement of conformal field theory, integrable systems, and several further areas of quantum field theory and string theory. S-matrices are not substitutes for a field-theoretic treatment, but rather, complement the end results of such.

Motivation

In high-energy particle physics one is interested in computing the probability for different outcomes in scattering experiments. These experiments can be broken down into three stages:

 Making a collection of incoming particles collide (usually two particles with high energies).
 Allowing the incoming particles to interact. These interactions may change the types of particles present (e.g. if an electron and a positron annihilate they may produce two photons).
 Measuring the resulting outgoing particles.

The process by which the incoming particles are transformed (through their interaction) into the outgoing particles is called scattering. For particle physics, a physical theory of these processes must be able to compute the probability for different outgoing particles when different incoming particles collide with different energies.

The S-matrix in quantum field theory achieves exactly this. It is assumed that the small-energy-density approximation is valid in these cases.

Use

The S-matrix is closely related to the transition probability amplitude in quantum mechanics and to cross sections of various interactions; the elements (individual numerical entries) in the S-matrix are known as scattering amplitudes. Poles of the S-matrix in the complex-energy plane are identified with bound states, virtual states or resonances. Branch cuts of the S-matrix in the complex-energy plane are associated to the opening of a scattering channel.

In the Hamiltonian approach to quantum field theory, the S-matrix may be calculated as a time-ordered exponential of the integrated Hamiltonian in the interaction picture; it may also be expressed using Feynman's path integrals. In both cases, the perturbative calculation of the S-matrix leads to Feynman diagrams.

In scattering theory, the S-matrix is an operator mapping free particle in-states to free particle out-states (scattering channels) in the Heisenberg picture. This is very useful because often we cannot describe the interaction (at least, not the most interesting ones) exactly.

In one-dimensional quantum mechanics
A simple prototype in which the S-matrix is 2-dimensional is considered first, for the purposes of illustration. In it, particles with sharp energy  scatter from a localized potential  according to the rules of 1-dimensional quantum mechanics. Already this simple model displays some features of more general cases, but is easier to handle.

Thus, the total S-matrix could, figuratively speaking, be visualized, in a suitable basis, as a "continuous matrix" with every element zero except for -blocks along the diagonal for a given .

Definition
Consider a localized one dimensional potential barrier , subjected to a beam of quantum particles with energy . These particles are incident on the potential barrier from left to right.

The solutions of Schrödinger's equation outside the potential barrier are plane waves given by

for the region to the left of the potential barrier, and

for the region to the right to the potential barrier, where

is the wave vector. The time dependence is not needed in our overview and is hence omitted. The term with coefficient  represents the incoming wave, whereas term with coefficient  represents the outgoing wave.  stands for the reflecting wave. Since we set the incoming wave moving in the positive direction (coming from the left),  is zero and can be omitted.

The "scattering amplitude", i.e., the transition overlap of the outgoing waves with the incoming waves is a linear relation defining the S-matrix,

The above relation can be written as

where

The elements of  completely characterize the scattering properties of the potential barrier .

Unitary property
The unitary property of the S-matrix is directly related to the conservation of the probability current in quantum mechanics.

The probability current density  of the wave function  is defined as

For conservation of the probability current, . This implies the S-matrix is a unitary matrix.

Time-reversal symmetry
If the potential  is real, then the system possesses time-reversal symmetry. Under this condition, if  is a solution of Schrödinger's equation, then  is also a solution.

The time-reversed solution is given by

for the region to the left to the potential barrier, and

for the region to the right to the potential barrier,
where the terms with coefficient ,  represent incoming wave, and terms with coefficient ,  represent outgoing wave.

They are again related by the S-matrix,

that is,

Now, the relations

together yield a condition

This condition, in conjunction with the unitarity relation, implies that the S-matrix is symmetric, as a result of time reversal symmetry,

By combining the symmetry and the unitarity, the S-matrix can be expressed in the form:
 
So the S-matrix is determined by three real parameters.

Transfer matrix 

In the case of time-reversal symmetry, the transfer matrix  can be expressed by three real parameters:

 

Finite square well 
The one-dimensional, non-relativistic problem with time-reversal symmetry of a particle with mass m that approaches a (static) finite square well, has the potential function V with 
The scattering can be solved by decomposing the wave packet of the free particle into plane waves  with wave numbers  for a plane wave coming (faraway) from the left side or likewise  (faraway) from the right side.

The S-matrix for the plane wave with wave number k has the solution:

Whereby   is the (increased) wave number of the plane wave inside the square well, as the energy eigenvalue  associated with the plane wave has to stay constant: 

The transmission is 

In the case of  then  and therefore  and  i.e. a plane wave with wave number k passes the well without reflection if  for a

Finite square barrier 

There are three different cases depending on the energy eigenvalue  of the plane waves (with wave numbers k resp. -k) far away from the barrier:

 : In this case  and the formulas for  have the same form as is in the square well case, and the transmission is 

 : In this case  and the wave function  has the property  inside the barrier and
  and 
The transmission is: . This intermediate case is not singular, it's the limit ( resp. ) from both sides.

 :In this case  is an imaginary number.

The solution for the S-matrix is:  
and likewise:  and also in this case .

Transmission coefficient and reflection coefficient
The transmission coefficient from the left of the potential barrier is, when ,

The reflection coefficient from the left of the potential barrier is, when ,

Similarly, the transmission coefficient from the right of the potential barrier is, when ,

The reflection coefficient from the right of the potential barrier is, when ,

The relations between the transmission and reflection coefficients are

and

This identity is a consequence of the unitarity property of the S-matrix.

Optical theorem in one dimension
In the case of free particles , the S-matrix is

Whenever  is different from zero, however, there is a departure of the S-matrix from the above form, to

From unitarity there also follows a relationship between these two functions,

The analogue of this identity in three dimensions is known as the optical theorem.

Definition in quantum field theory

Interaction picture
A straightforward way to define the S-matrix begins with considering the interaction picture. Let the Hamiltonian  be split into the free part  and the interaction , . In this picture, the operators behave as free field operators and the state vectors have dynamics according to the interaction . Let

denote a state that has evolved from a free initial state

The S-matrix element is then defined as the projection of this state on the final state

Thus

where  is the S-operator. The great advantage of this definition is that the time-evolution operator  evolving a state in the interaction picture is formally known,

where  denotes the time-ordered product. Expressed in this operator,

from which

Expanding using the knowledge about  gives a Dyson series,

or, if  comes as a Hamiltonian density,

Being a special type of time-evolution operator,  is unitary. For any initial state and any final state one finds

This approach is somewhat naïve in that potential problems are swept under the carpet. This is intentional. The approach works in practice and some of the technical issues are addressed in the other sections.

In and out states
Here a slightly more rigorous approach is taken in order to address potential problems that were disregarded in the interaction picture approach of above. The final outcome is, of course, the same as when taking the quicker route. For this, the notions of in and out states are needed. These will be developed in two ways, from vacua, and from free particle states. Needless to say, the two approaches are equivalent, but they illuminate matters from different angles.

From vacua
If  is a creation operator, its hermitian adjoint is an annihilation operator and destroys the vacuum,

In Dirac notation, define

as a vacuum quantum state, i.e. a state without real particles. The asterisk signifies that not all vacua are necessarily equal, and certainly not equal to the Hilbert space zero state . All vacuum states are assumed Poincaré invariant, invariance under translations, rotations and boosts, formally,

Thus the description of the vacuum is independent of the frame of reference. Attention is here focused to the simplest case, that of a scalar theory in order to exemplify with the least possible cluttering of the notation. The in and out fields satisfy

the free Klein–Gordon equation. These fields are postulated to have the same equal time commutation relations (ETCR) as the free fields,

These operators satisfy the usual commutation rules,

The action of the creation operators on their respective vacua and states with a finite number of particles in the in and out states is given by

where issues of normalization have been ignored. See the next section for a detailed account on how a general  state is normalized. The initial and final spaces are defined by

The asymptotic states are assumed to have well defined Poincaré transformation properties, i.e. they are assumed to transform as a direct product of one-particle states. This is a characteristic of a non-interacting field. From this follows that the asymptotic states are all eigenstates of the momentum operator ,

In particular, they are eigenstates of the full Hamiltonian,

The vacuum is usually postulated to be stable and unique,

The interaction is assumed adiabatically turned on and off.

Heisenberg picture
The Heisenberg picture is employed henceforth. In this picture, the states are time-independent. A Heisenberg state vector thus represents the complete spacetime history of a system of particles. The labeling of the in and out states refers to the asymptotic appearance. Using the assumption that the in and out states, as well as the interacting states, inhabit the same Hilbert space and assuming completeness of the normalized in and out states (postulate of asymptotic completeness), the initial states can be expanded in a basis of final states (or vice versa). The explicit expression is given later after more notation and terminology has been introduced. The expansion coefficients are precisely the S-matrix elements to be defined below.

While the state vectors are constant in time in the Heisenberg picture, the physical states they represent are not. If a system is found to be in a state  at time , then it will be found in the state  at time . This is not (necessarily) the same Heisenberg state vector, but it is an equivalent state vector, meaning that it will, upon measurement, be found to be one of the final states from the expansion with nonzero coefficient. Letting  vary one sees that the observed  (not measured) is indeed the Schrödinger picture state vector. By repeating the measurement sufficiently many times and averaging, one may say that the same state vector is indeed found at time  as at time . This reflects the expansion above of an in state into out states.

From free particle states
For this viewpoint, one should consider how the archetypical scattering experiment is performed. The initial particles are prepared in well defined states where they are so far apart that they don't interact. They are somehow made to interact, and the final particles are registered when they are so far apart that they have ceased to interact. The idea is to look for states in the Heisenberg picture that in the distant past had the appearance of free particle states. This will be the in states. Likewise, an out state will be a state that in the distant future has the appearance of a free particle state.

The notation from the general reference for this section,  will be used. A general non-interacting multi-particle state is given by

where
 is momentum,
 is spin z-component or, in the massless case, helicity,
 is particle species.
These states are normalized as

Permutations work as such; if  is a permutation of  objects (for a  state) such that

then a nonzero term results. The sign is plus unless  involves an odd number of fermion transpositions, in which case it is minus. The notation is usually abbreviated letting one Greek letter stand for the whole collection describing the state. In abbreviated form the normalization becomes

When integrating over free-particle states one writes in this notation

where the sum includes only terms such that no two terms are equal modulo a permutation of the particle type indices. The sets of states sought for are supposed to be complete. This is expressed as

which could be paraphrased as

where for each fixed , the right hand side is a projection operator onto the state . Under an inhomogeneous Lorentz transformation , the field transforms according to the rule

so the in and out states sough after are eigenstates of the full Hamiltonian that are necessarily non-interacting due to the absence of mixed particle energy terms. The discussion in the section above suggests that the in states  and the out states  should be such that

Wave packages are necessary, else the time evolution will yield only a phase factor indicating free particles, which cannot be the case. The right hand side follows from that the in and out states are eigenstates of the Hamiltonian per above. To formalize this requirement, assume that the full Hamiltonian  can be divided into two terms, a free-particle Hamiltonian  and an interaction ,  such that the eigenstates  of  have the same appearance as the in- and out-states with respect to normalization and Lorentz transformation properties,

The in and out states are defined as eigenstates of the full Hamiltonian,

satisfying

Define

then

This last expression will work only using wave packages.From these definitions follow that the in and out states are normalized in the same way as the free-particle states,

and the three sets are unitarily equivalent. Now rewrite the eigenvalue equation,

where the  terms has been added to make the operator on the LHS invertible.

on the RHS to obtain

Then use the completeness of the free-particle states,

to finally obtain

Here  has been replaced by its eigenvalue on the free-particle states. This is the Lippmann–Schwinger equation.

In states expressed as out states
The initial states can be expanded in a basis of final states (or vice versa). Using the completeness relation,

where  is the probability that the interaction transforms

into
.
By the ordinary rules of quantum mechanics,

and one may write

The expansion coefficients are precisely the S-matrix elements to be defined below.

The S-matrix
The S-matrix is now defined by

Associated to the S-matrix there is the S-operator  defined by

This definition conforms with the direct approach used in the interaction picture. Also, due to unitary equivalence,

As a physical requirement,  must be a unitary operator. This is a statement of conservation of probability in quantum field theory. But

By completeness then,

so S is the unitary transformation from in-states to out states.
Lorentz invariance is another crucial requirement on the S-matrix. The S-operator represents the quantum canonical transformation of the initial in states to the final out states. Moreover,  leaves the vacuum state invariant and transforms in-space fields to out-space fields,

In terms of creation and annihilation operators, this becomes

hence

A similar expression holds when  operates to the left on an out state. This means that the S-matrix can be expressed as

If  describes an interaction correctly, these properties must be also true:
 If the system is made up with a single particle in momentum eigenstate , then . This follows from the calculation above as a special case.
 The S-matrix element may be nonzero only where the output state has the same total momentum as the input state. This follows from the required Lorentz invariance of the S-matrix.

Evolution operator U
Define a time-dependent creation and annihilation operator as follows,

so, for the fields,

where

We allow for a phase difference, given by

By inspection, it can be seen that this formula is not explicitly covariant.

Dyson series

The most widely used expression for the S-matrix is the Dyson series. This expresses the S-matrix operator as the series:

where:
  denotes time-ordering,
  denotes the interaction Hamiltonian density which describes the interactions in the theory.

The not-S-matrix 
Since the transformation of particles from black hole to Hawking radiation could not be described with an S-matrix, Stephen Hawking proposed a "not-S-matrix", for which he used the dollar sign ($), and which therefore was also called "dollar matrix".

See also

Feynman diagram
LSZ reduction formula
Wick's theorem
Haag's theorem
Interaction picture

Remarks

Notes

References
 §125

Quantum field theory
Scattering theory
Matrices
Mathematical physics